Victoria was one of the original 25 provincial electoral districts in Alberta, named for Fort Victoria on the North Saskatchewan River. It was mandated to return a single member to the Legislative Assembly of Alberta by the first past the post method until 1917, and by instant-runoff voting from 1926 until it was abolished in 1940.

History

Boundary history
The Victoria electoral district was one of the original 25 electoral districts contested in the 1905 Alberta general election upon Alberta joining Confederation in September 1905. The district was carried over from the old Victoria electoral district which returned a single member to the Legislative Assembly of the Northwest Territories from 1894 to 1905. The old electoral district had covered the part of the District of Alberta directly north and east of Edmonton. The new province moved Victoria's boundary further east to the Fourth Meridian, to reflect the change in Alberta's shape, while the northwest part of Victoria became the new district of Sturgeon.

Jack Shera the incumbent from the Northwest Territories Legislature who was first elected in 1898 Northwest Territories general election was defeated in the 1905 general election by Liberal Francis A. Walker.

In 1909, the area north of the North Saskatchewan River was split off to create the Pakan district, named for the town at Fort Victoria. This greatly reduced Victoria's size and moved its namesake outside of its boundaries. It covered approximately the same area as the present-day Lamont County, along with Fort Saskatchewan.

Victoria disappeared in 1940 when it was merged with Whitford to create Willingdon.

Representation history
Victoria's first MLA was Francis A. Walker, defeating incumbent N.W.T. MLA Jack Shera. He served as a backbencher with the Liberal government for all four terms it was in power. In 1917, he was returned to the Legislature by acclamation because the province declared all active servicemen in World War I re-elected.

However, in 1921 William Fedun, a Ukrainian immigrant, narrowly defeated Walker to capture Victoria for the upstart United Farmers of Alberta, which formed government after the election. He chose to retire after one term.

UFA candidate Rudolph Hennig again narrowly won Victoria in 1926 on the second count, despite another strong challenge from Walker. He served one term but did not win the UFA nomination in the next election.

1930 saw the closest election yet in Victoria, with UFA candidate Peter Miskew defeating his Liberal opponent by less than 100 votes. However, Miskew would almost immediately cross the floor to the Liberal opposition.

When the United Farmers were swept out of power in 1935, Social Credit candidate Samuel Calvert, another WWI veteran, easily captured Victoria for his party. After his first term, Victoria was abolished in time for the 1940 election, and Calvert chose to retire from politics.

Election results

1900s

|}
The returning officer for the 1905 election in Victoria was Albert Ernest Archer.

In 1909, no candidates stood against Francis Walker, and he was declared acclaimed.

|}

1910s

|}
1913 swing is calculated from the 1905 election.

In 1917, because Walker was an active serviceman in World War I, he was automatically re-elected by acclamation for a second time.

|}

1920s

|}
1921 swing is calculated from the 1913 election.

For the 1926 election, the UFA government introduced alternative vote in rural constituencies. Since no candidate won a majority in the first round, second preferences were included.

|-
!colspan=6|Final count

|-
|
|colspan=2|No preference
|align=right|378

|}
Final count swing represents vote share increase from the initial count. Overall swing is calculated from the initial count.

1930s

|}

|}

See also
List of Alberta provincial electoral districts
List of electoral districts in Canada named Victoria
Victoria (N.W.T. electoral district), a former Northwest Territories electoral district from 1894 to 1905
Victoria (Alberta electoral district), a federal electoral district in Alberta, Canada, that was represented in the House of Commons of Canada from 1909 to 1925

References

Further reading

External links
Elections Alberta
The Legislative Assembly of Alberta

Former provincial electoral districts of Alberta